Bil Marinkovic (born 16 August 1973) is a blind Paralympic athlete from Austria who competes mostly in throwing events.

Bil has competed in four consecutive Paralympics. In his first appearance in 2000  he competed in the F12 discus, javelin, pentathlon and 100m, failing to win a medal in any of the disciplines.  At the 2004 Summer Paralympics he competed in the more severe F11 classification, for athletes with no usable vision. He won the gold medal in the javelin, breaking the then world record with his throw. He won a bronze medal in the F11 discus event at the 2012 Summer Paralympics. He has won multiple IPC Athletics World Championships medals.

Marinkovic is the current F11 world record holder in javelin.

Currently, Marinkovic is trained by the former Olympic athlete and Gerhard Mayer.

References

External links
 
 Bill Marinkovic, detailed profile and news feed from Hilfsgemeinschaft der Blinden. Via Google Translate.

1973 births
Living people
Austrian male discus throwers
Austrian male javelin throwers
Austrian male shot putters
Paralympic athletes of Austria
Paralympic gold medalists for Austria
Paralympic bronze medalists for Austria
Paralympic medalists in athletics (track and field)
Athletes (track and field) at the 2000 Summer Paralympics
Athletes (track and field) at the 2004 Summer Paralympics
Athletes (track and field) at the 2008 Summer Paralympics
Athletes (track and field) at the 2012 Summer Paralympics
Medalists at the 2004 Summer Paralympics
Medalists at the 2012 Summer Paralympics
World record holders in Paralympic athletics
Visually impaired discus throwers
Visually impaired javelin throwers
Visually impaired shot putters
Paralympic discus throwers
Paralympic javelin throwers
Paralympic shot putters